Hartzenberg is a surname. Notable people with the surname include:

 Ferdi Hartzenberg (1936–2021), South African politician
 Munier Hartzenberg (born 1997), South African rugby union player
 Yaya Hartzenberg (born 1989), South African rugby union player

See also
 Hartenberg